Antoinette Sedillo Lopez (born 1956/1957) is an American attorney, politician, and retired professor who is serving as a member of the New Mexico Senate since 2019. She was appointed in January 2019 to succeed Cisco McSorley following his resignation and was re-elected in the 2020 election.

Early life and education 
Sedillo Lopez was raised on her parents' farm in Los Chavez, New Mexico and attended Belen High School. She earned a Bachelor of Arts degree from the University of New Mexico and a Juris Doctor from the UCLA School of Law.

Career

Law career 
After graduating from law school, Sedillo Lopez worked as a law clerk for the United States Court of Appeals for the District of Columbia Circuit.

Prior to entering the legislature, Sedillo Lopez was a law professor at the University of New Mexico School of Law for 27 years, where she specialized in ethics, civil procedure, and family law. She retired as the associate dean for clinical affairs.

She also served as Executive Director for Albuquerque's Enlace Comunitario https://lawschool.unm.edu/news/2014/01/lopez.html; a New Mexico non-profit that helps and represents individuals and their families experiencing domestic violence by working to decrease gender inequity and intimate partner violence in the Latinx immigrant community in Central New Mexico.

2018 U.S. House campaign 

In 2018, Sedillo Lopez was a candidate for New Mexico's 1st congressional district. A political progressive, Sedillo Lopez advocated for a Medicare for All healthcare system during her campaign. In the Democratic primary, she placed third after Damon Martinez and eventual winner Deb Haaland. During her campaign, Sedillo Lopez was endorsed by Justice Democrats and The People for Bernie Sanders.

New Mexico Senate 
In January 2019, Sedillo Lopez was appointed to the New Mexico Senate by the Bernalillo County Commission to succeed Cisco McSorley following his resignation. She is the vice chair of the Senate Conservation Committee and a member of the Senate Public Affairs Committee. As a member of the New Mexico Senate, she sponsored a bill that would have placed a moratorium on fracking in the state.

2021 U.S. House campaign 

Following the announcement of Haaland as Joe Biden's nominee for secretary of the interior, Sedillo Lopez announced her campaign in a special election for the seat. She placed first with 74 votes in the first round of the Democratic convention to nominate a candidate, and was defeated in the second round by State Representative Melanie Stansbury. Stansbury received 103 votes and Sedillo Lopez got 97.

Personal life 
Sedillo Lopez met her husband, Victor S. Lopez, while they were students at the UCLA School of Law. They have three children. Victor Lopez is a district judge of the New Mexico 2nd Judicial District Court for Division XXVII. They live in Albuquerque, New Mexico.

References

External links
 Government website
 Campaign website

Year of birth missing (living people)
Democratic Party New Mexico state senators
Living people
21st-century American politicians
21st-century American women politicians
Candidates in the 2021 United States elections
Hispanic and Latino American state legislators in New Mexico
Hispanic and Latino American women in politics
People from Valencia County, New Mexico
University of New Mexico alumni
UCLA School of Law alumni
Women state legislators in New Mexico
New Mexico lawyers
University of New Mexico faculty
Belen High School alumni
People from Albuquerque, New Mexico
American women academics